The Greater Medan metropolitan area, known locally as Mebidangro (an acronym of Medan–Binjai–Deli Serdang–Karo) is a metropolitan area in North Sumatra, Indonesia, which consists of Medan City, Binjai City, Deli Serdang Regency and part (4 districts) of Karo Regency. The metropolitan area is established by a presidential decree in 2011. It is a leading economic centre in western Indonesia, especially for provinces of Aceh, North Sumatra, West Sumatra and Riau. The metropolitan area also serves as a hub for western Indonesia.

Demography 

The four districts of Karo Regency within the metropolitan area are Merdaka, Berastagi, Dolat Rayat and Barusjahe.

References 

Metropolitan areas of Indonesia
North Sumatra